Lernaea cyprinacea is a species of parasitic crustacean belonging to the family Lernaeidae. It may be native to Eurasia, and has been introduced to the United Kingdom and the United States. It is regarded as a major pest in aquaculture.

References

Cyclopoida